Karl Paranya (born June 27, 1975) was the first NCAA Division III track and field athlete to break 4 minutes for the mile.  He did this in the spring of 1997, running 3:57.6 on Haverford College's outdoor track.  Marcus O'Sullivan, one of three men ever to run over 100 sub-4 minute miles, paced Paranya in this record breaking run See the race on youtube.

Early life
Karl Paranya is from Unadilla, New York.

Record for men's 4x800 relay
On February 6, 2000, at the Boston Indoor Games, Paranya, along with Joey Woody, Rich Kenah and David Krummenacker set a current Indoor World Record in the men's 4x800-meter relay, posting a time of 7:13.94.  This record cut nearly four seconds off the previous mark, held by the Soviet Union for nearly thirty years.  At the date this addendum was written, Paranya's best time in the mile was 3:54.83 posted on May 30, 1999, in Eugene Oregon, the 225th fastest mile in history.

Olympics
He ran in the 1996 and 2000 United States Olympic Trials (track and field).

References

1975 births
Living people
American male middle-distance runners